Sabse Bada Kalakar (English: Greatest artist) is an auditioning Reality show on Sony TV Channel. This is the first time Sony TV comes up with such show to hunt the entertaining and acting qualities of kid contestants. The judges of the show are Boman Irani., Raveena Tandon and Arshad Warsi. This show is written by Dinesh Brigedier This show was rumoured to replace Indian Idol. After the Super Dancer, this show will again create a huge buzz. The title track was sung by LV Revanth, the winner of Indian Idol.

The first episode of this season was aired on 8 April 2017 and last episode of this season was aired on 9 July 2017.

The Top Ten after the auditions are : 
Vrinda Gujral, Mahi Soni, Inayat Verma, Dhruv Acharya, Udhbhav, Satyam Arora, Keshav Mehndiratta, Mandeep Kaur Sekhon, Virad Tyagi, Tanya and Tanisha (twins).

Each Contestant is paired up an Acting Guru with whom they will have to perform acts if in the danger zone and who will be mentoring the kids. The acting Guru's on the show are:

Karan Singh Chhabra, Subuhi Joshi, Kamna Pathak, Onisha Sharma, Mohit Agarwal, Saurabh Nayyar, Sumit Goswami, Bhasha Sumbli, Arun Shinde, Manjiri Popala.

Samarth got a wild card entry into the show along with his Guru Sunil Soni.

Four Semifinalists of the show are: Virad Tyagi, Mahi Soni, Dhruv Acharya, Vrinda Gujral

Mandeep Sekhon was eliminated in the semifinals. Rest 4 will have to compete in the Grand Finale on July 8 & 9.

The Winner of Sabse Bada Kalakar 2017 Grand Finale is 7 year old Saharanpur(U.P) boy Virad Tyagi.

References

2017 Indian television series debuts
Hindi-language television shows
Indian reality television series
Television shows set in Mumbai
Frames Production series
Sony Entertainment Television original programming